This list of tallest buildings in South Korea ranks skyscrapers in South Korea by height. The tallest building in South Korea is currently the 123–story Lotte World Tower, which rises  and was completed on 22 December 2016. It is also the world's fifth tallest building. Other building complexes topping 300m include the three-building complex Haeundae LCT The Sharp in Busan, Parc1 in Seoul's Yeouido district, as well as the Northeast Asia Trade Tower in Incheon. The Hyundai Global Business Center, which began construction in May 2020 in Seoul's Gangnam District, is expected to become Korea's tallest building upon completion in 2026. Also under construction is the Cheongna City Tower in Incheon, although this structure is likely to eventually be classified as a tower rather than a building.

Tallest buildings 
Only buildings over 180m (as determined by the Council on Tall Buildings and Urban Habitat) are included.

Tallest under construction 
This lists buildings that are under construction in South Korea and are planned to rise at least . Buildings that have been topped out but are not completed are also included.

Tallest on hold

Tallest approved or proposed
This lists ranks South Korea's skyscrapers over  that are currently approved or proposed for construction.

List of other buildings planned over 55 floors for which the height hasn't been disclosed:

Tallest buildings by administrative divisions 
This is the list of the tallest buildings by top tier administrative divisions (Provinces, Special Cities, Metropolitan Cities)

Timeline of tallest buildings

Tallest structures

See also 
 List of tallest buildings in North Korea
 List of tallest buildings and structures in the world

References

External links 
 Council on Tall Buildings and Urban Habitat – Documents most planned, built and under-construction skyscrapers
 Emporis – International database of various buildings
 Urbika – Includes many projects not documented by other websites
 SkyscraperPage – Database and diagrams of most skyscrapers

 
Korea, South
South Korea